Post Oak Point is an unincorporated community in Austin County, in the U.S. state of Texas. According to the Handbook of Texas, the community had a population of 40 in 2000. It is located within the Greater Houston metropolitan area.

History
The area in what is known as Post Oak Point today was first settled around 1850 by German immigrants who raised cotton and livestock. The town itself was founded at the turn of the century and a church was located somewhere near the area. A post office was established at Post Oak Point in 1901 and remained in operation until 1907 and was named for the lumber along a stretch of the east bank of the San Bernard River. A store was opened by F.B. Miller in 1910. Five years later, it had a population of 100. It went down to 75 in 1936 with two businesses. It continued to shrink to 40 in 2000.

Geography

Education
A school was located near Post Oak Point sometime before the 20th century. Today, the community is served by the Bellville Independent School District.

References

Unincorporated communities in Austin County, Texas
Unincorporated communities in Texas